The British Supermarine Spitfire was one of the most popular fighter aircraft of the Second World War. The basic airframe proved to be extremely adaptable, capable of taking far more powerful engines and far greater loads than its original role as a short-range interceptor had allowed for. This would lead to 24 marks of Spitfire, and many sub-variants within the marks, being produced throughout the Second World War and beyond, in continuing efforts to fulfill Royal Air Force requirements and successfully combat ever-improving enemy aircraft.

The Spitfire was also adopted for service on aircraft carriers of the Royal Navy; in this role they were renamed Supermarine Seafire. Although the first version of the Seafire, the Seafire Ib, was a straight adaptation of the Spitfire Vb, successive variants incorporated much needed strengthening of the basic structure of the airframe and equipment changes in order to survive the demanding maritime environment. As a result, the later Seafire variants were usually heavier and, in the case of the Seafire XV/XVII and F. 47 series, they were very different aircraft to their land-based counterparts.

It is notable that throughout the entire development process, which took place over twelve years, from 1935 through to 1948, there were no outstanding failures of the basic design: this is a real testament to the original genius of Reginald J. Mitchell, his successor Joseph Smith, and the design teams they led.

The Rolls-Royce Merlin and Griffon engines
A key factor which allowed the continued development of the Spitfire was the development of progressively more powerful and improved engines, starting with the Rolls-Royce Merlin and progressing to the bigger and more powerful Rolls-Royce Griffon. The evolution of high octane aviation fuels and improved supercharger designs enabled Rolls-Royce to extract increasing amounts of power from the same basic designs. For example, the Merlin II and III which powered the Spitfire I produced a maximum of 1,030 hp (770 kW) using the 87 octane aviation fuel which was generally available from 1938 through to 1941; from early 1940 increasing supplies of 100 octane fuel allowed the maximum power to be increased to 1,310 hp (977 kW) with an increased supercharger boost pressure, albeit for a maximum time limit of 5 minutes. In 1944 100/150 grade fuels enabled the Merlin 66 to produce 1,860 hp (1,387 kW) at low altitudes in F.S gear.

Single stage superchargers
As a result, the prefixes which were used on most later Spitfire variants; LF, F, and HF; indicated whether the engines fitted were suited for low, medium or high altitude, respectively. The use of these prefixes did not change according to the wings, which could be fitted with "clipped" tips, reducing the wingspan to about 32 ft 6 in (9.9 m) (this could vary slightly), or the "pointed" tips which increased the wingspan to 40 ft 2 in (12.29 m).

The original Merlin and Griffon engine designs used single-stage superchargers. For engines equipped with a single-stage supercharger the air being forced through the supercharger air intake was compressed by the supercharger's impeller. In the case of the Merlin II/III, XII and 40 series as the air was being compressed it was mixed with fuel which was fed through an SU carburettor before being fed into the engine's cylinders. The Merlin III produced 1,030 hp (770 kW) at +6¼lb/in² (43 kPa) of "boost" (the "boost" is the pressure to which the air/fuel mixture is compressed before being fed to the cylinders).

Two-Stage, Two-Speed superchargers

The most fundamental change made to the later Merlin (60, 70, 80, and 100 series) and Griffon engines (60 and 80 series) was the incorporation of a two-stage, two-speed supercharger, which provided a considerable increase in power, especially at higher altitudes. Two-stage refers to the use of two impellers on a common driveshaft, constituting two superchargers in series. As air was drawn through the air intake, fuel was pumped into the airstream by the carburettor. The first-stage impeller compressed the air-fuel mixture and this was then fed to the smaller second-stage impeller which further compressed the mixture.

The impellers were driven by a hydraulically operated two-speed gearbox. At low to medium altitudes, the supercharger was in Moderate Supercharger or M.S. gear (this referred to the gearing and thus the speed, at which the impellers were operating). Once the aircraft reached and climbed through a set critical altitude, ( for the Merlin 61 and 70 series) the power would start to drop as the atmospheric pressure (the density of air) dropped. As the critical altitude was passed a pressure-operated aneroid capsule operated the gearbox, which changed speed to Full Supercharger (F.S.) gear, which drove the impellers faster, thus compressing a greater volume of the air-fuel mixture.

An intercooler was required to stop the compressed mixture from becoming too hot and either igniting before reaching the cylinders (pre-ignition knocking) or creating a condition known as knocking or detonation. The intercooler, which was separate from the engine cooling system, with its own supply of glycol and water coolant, was mounted in the induction system, between the outlet of the second-stage supercharger and behind the cylinder blocks. The hot air-fuel mixture from the supercharger was circulated though and around the coolant tubes and was then passed on to the main induction manifold, through which it was fed into the cylinders. The intercooler also circulated coolant through passages in the supercharger casing and between the impellers. Finally, an extra radiator (mounted in the starboard radiator duct under the wing of the Spitfire) was used to dissipate the intercooler's excess charge heat.

With the two-stage, two-speed supercharger, two sets of power ratings can be quoted. The F.S. gear required approximately 200 hp (149 kW) to drive it. As a result, the maximum power generated by the Merlin 61 in F.S. was 1,390 hp (1,036 kW) at  using + 15 lb/in² of boost. The Merlin 66 used in the LF Mk IX produced slightly more power but because of the use of slightly different gear ratios driving smaller impellers, the critical altitude ratings of the supercharger stages were lower,  and  respectively. (Unlike the Merlin engines the Griffons used superchargers which were designed to achieve maximum performance over a wider altitude band; as such there were no Griffon engined LF or HF Spitfire variants.)

Carburettors
The original production variants of the Merlin used an SU manufactured carburettor in which the fuel flow was metered through a float. In most circumstances this proved to be sufficient but during the air battles over Dunkirk and during the Battle of Britain it was found that whenever the Merlin was subjected to negative "g" forces, such as a quick "bunt" into a dive, the engine would briefly lose power through petrol starvation. This was because the petrol in the float was being thrown away from the feed pipe to the supercharger. The fuel injected Daimler-Benz DB 601 engine gave the Bf 109 especially an advantage over the carburettor-equipped engine; no Spitfire could simply "bunt" and dive away from an opponent as the 109 could.
The remedy, invented by Beatrice "Tilly" Shilling, was to fit a metal diaphragm with a hole in it, across the float chambers. It partly cured the problem of fuel starvation in a dive. The device was commonly referred to as 'Miss Shilling's Orifice'.

The full remedy was to use the Bendix-Stromberg pressure carburettor, which allowed more precise metering of the amount of fuel used by the engine and prevented fuel starvation. This new carburettor was used from the Merlin 66 series and on all Griffon engines. In these engines the carburettor injected fuel at 5 psi through a nozzle direct into the supercharger and the compressed air-fuel mixture was then directed to the cylinders. The final development was the SU injection carburettor, that injected fuel into the supercharger using a fuel pump driven as a function of crankshaft speed and engine pressures; although this was fitted to the 100 series Merlins, which were not used in production Spitfires, it was used in the Griffon 60 and 80 series.

Boost pressure measurements
The British measured boost pressure as lbs./sq.inch (or psi) above a nominal value of atmospheric pressure at sea level. A reading of +6 meant that the air/fuel mix was being compressed by a supercharger blower to 20.7 (rounded figure) psi before entering the engine; +25 meant that the air/fuel mix was being compressed to 39.7 psi – 14.7 psi atmospheric pressure added to the "boost" pressure of 25 psi.

Ram jet assistance
In an attempt to boost the performance of the Spitfire Mk1 in May 1940, RAe scientists (including Hayne Constant) developed a 'propulsive duct'. This was in essence a simple ram jet, fed by petrol, utilising the Meredith effect. Bench tests showed that the increase in speed was not significant and the device was not flight tested. In 1943 the idea was reconsidered as a counter to the threat of the V1. Aircraft such as the Hawker Tempest and Gloster Meteor were not widely available and the Spitfire would only be able to intercept in a diving attack. A. D. Baxter and C. W. R. Smith at Farnborough reviewed the 1940 work and concluded that it was practical but problems with drag and pressure loss were encountered and the V1 had been beaten before they were solved.

Dimensions, performance and armament
Due to the many differences in production Spitfires, performance could vary widely, even between aircraft with the same Mark number. Factors such as weight, external fittings, airframe and engine condition, among others, influenced how an aircraft performed. For example, even relatively minor damage on the wing leading edges could drastically reduce top speed. The most reliable performance figures and weight measurements came from the tests carried out throughout the Second World War by the Aeroplane & Armament Experimental Establishment (A&AEE) based at Boscombe Down.

Early Merlin engines

Late Merlin and Griffon

Seafire

References

Footnotes

Citations

Bibliography
 Air Ministry. A.P 1565 Spifire IA and IB Aeroplanes: Merlin II and III engines, Pilot's Notes. London: Air Ministry, 1940.
 Air Ministry. A.P 1565B Spifire IIA and IIB Aeroplanes: Merlin XII Engine, Pilot's Notes (July 1940). London: Air Data Publications, 1972 (reprint). .
 Brown, David. The Seafire: The Spitfire That Went to Sea. Annapolis, MD: Naval Institute Press, 1989. 
Chapel, Charles Eward; Bent, Ralph D; McKinley, James L. Aircraft Power Plants: by the technical development staff of Northrop Aeronautical Institute. New York: McGraw-Hill Book Company Inc., 1955.

 Gruenhagen, Robert W. Mustang: The Story of the P-51 Fighter (rev. ed.). New York: Arco Publishing Company, Inc., 1980. .
 Harvey-Bailey, A. The Merlin in Perspective: The Combat Years . Derby, UK: Rolls-Royce Heritage Trust, 1995 (4th edition). .
 Lovesey, A C. "Development of the Rolls-Royce Merlin from 1939 to 1945." Aircraft Engineering and Aerospace Technology, Volume 18, Issue 7. London, MCB UP Ltd., July 1946. ISSN 0002-2667.
 Lowrey, Joseph. "A Case For Standardisation: Puzzle of the Boost Gauge; British Unit an Anachronism: "Centibar" Suggested" (article and images). Flight and the Aircraft Engineer No. 1823, Vol XLIV, 2 December 1943.
 Morgan, Eric B and Edward Shacklady. Spitfire: The History. Stamford: Key Books Ltd, 2000. .
 Price, Alfred. Late Marque Spitfire Aces 1942–1945. Oxford, UK: Osprey Publishing, 1995. .
 Price, Alfred. Spitfire Mark I/II Aces 1939–41. London: Osprey Aerospace, 1996. .
 Price, Alfred. The Spitfire Story: New edited edition. London: Weidenfeld Military, 1999. .
 Price, Alfred. The Spitfire Story: Revised edition. Sparkford, Somerset, UK: Haynes Publishing, 2010. 
 Robertson, Bruce. Spitfire: The Story of a Famous Fighter. Hemel Hempstead, Hertfordshire, UK: Model & Allied Publications Ltd., 1960. Third revised edition 1973. .
 Smallwood, Hugh. Spitfire in Blue. London: Osprey Aerospace, 1996. 
 Smith, G. Geoffrey.  "A British Masterpiece." (article and images). Flight and the Aircraft Engineer No. 1731, Volume XLI, 26 February 1942.
 Thomas, Andrew.Griffon Spitfire Aces: Aircraft of the Aces 81. London: Osprey Aerospace, 2008. .
"Rolls-Royce Griffon (65)" (article and images). Flight and the Aircraft Engineer No. 1917, Vol.XLVIII, 20 September 1945.

Supermarine Spitfire
Supermarine Spitfire